Triphaenopsis jezoensis is a species of moth of the family Noctuidae. It is found in Japan and Taiwan.

References

Moths described in 1962
Hadeninae
Moths of Japan